Nicholas Turner (born 3 August 1983) is a New Zealand cricketer. He played first-class cricket for Otago and Auckland between 2006 and 2010.

See also
 List of Otago representative cricketers
 List of Auckland representative cricketers

References

External links
 

1983 births
Living people
New Zealand cricketers
Auckland cricketers
Otago cricketers
Cricketers from Invercargill